Stiquito (pronounced sti ke to) is a small, inexpensive hexapod (i.e., six-legged) robot commonly used by universities, high schools, and hobbyists, since 1992.

Stiquito's "muscles" are made of nitinol, a shape memory alloy that expands and contracts, roughly emulating the operation of a muscle. The application of heat causes a crystalline structure change in the wire. Nitinol contracts when heated and returns to its original size and shape when cooled.

Stiquito was developed by Jonathan W. Mills of Indiana University as an inexpensive vehicle for his research.  He soon found its applications extended to educational uses.  It has been used to introduce students to the concepts of analogue electronics, digital electronics, computer control, and robotics.  It has also been used for advanced topics such as subsumption architectures, artificial intelligence, and advanced computer architecture.

Further reading
These books contain instructions for building the Stiquito robot, instructions for designing and building control circuits, and examples of student projects that use Stiquito.  Most importantly, the books contain all the supplies needed to build the robot.

  This first book contains chapters written by the co-author, their students, and other roboticists.  These chapters describe the Stiquito Robots, their applications, and examples of Stiquito's robot cousins.  Of note is a chapter by well known robot inventor Mark Tilden.  The kit included inside the book is the original Stiquito robot.
  This second book has more of an educational bent.  It includes experiments with electricity, electronics, and nitinol.  It also has several examples of computer/microcontroller control of the Stiquito Robot.  The kit included inside the book is the original Stiquito robot.
  This third book includes more educational material on Stiquito Computer/microcontroller control of the Stiquito Robot.  The kit included inside the book is the TI MSP430-based controller board and the Stiquito robot, “Stiquito Controlled”.

The first book was compiled from material written between 1991 and 1996.  The chapter has more of a "research" feel since it shows the base robot and slight variations and applications of it.

The second book was compiled from materials written specifically for education.  It includes instructions of control using supplemental kits.

The third book is also educationally-based.  It is a slight departure from the first two books because the third book (and the included kit) are centered around a microcontroller board and its leg actuation electronics.

External links
Stiquito home page
 Audio interview with James Conrad about the history of Stiquito Robots Podcast 8 August 2014

Robot kits
1992 robots
Hexapod robots
Robots of the United States